Milk glass is an opaque or translucent, milk white or colored glass that can be blown or pressed into a wide variety of shapes.  First made in Venice in the 16th century, colors include blue, pink, yellow, brown, black, and white.

Principle

Milk glass contains dispersion of particles with refractive index significantly different from the glass matrix, which scatter light by the Tyndall scattering mechanism. The size distribution and density of the particles control the overall effect, which may range from mild opalization to opaque white. Some glasses are somewhat more blue from the side, and somewhat red-orange in pass-through light.

The particles are produced via addition of opacifiers to the melt. Some opacifiers can be insoluble and only dispersed in the melt. Others are added as precursors and react in the melt, or dissolve in the molten glass and then precipitate as crystals on cooling; this is similar to color production in striking glasses, but the particles are much bigger.

The opacifiers can be e.g. bone ash, or tin dioxide and arsenic and antimony compounds. They are also added to ceramic glazes, which can be chemically considered to be a specific kind of milk glass.

History

First made in Venice in the 16th century (lattimo) as a translucent competitor for porcelain, colors include blue, pink, yellow, brown, black, and white. Some 19th-century glass makers called milky white opaque glass "opal glass". The name milk glass is relatively recent. 

Made into decorative dinnerware, lamps, vases, and costume jewellery, milk glass was highly popular during the fin de siècle. Pieces made for the wealthy of the Gilded Age are known for their delicacy and beauty in color and design, while Depression glass pieces of the 1930s and 1940s are less so.

Milk glass is often used for architectural decoration when one of the underlying purposes is the display of graphic information.  The original milk glass marquee of the Chicago Theatre has been donated to the Smithsonian Institution. A famous use of milk glass is for the four faces of the information booth clock at Grand Central Terminal in New York City. Barbetta, the New York Italian restaurant founded in 1906 and still in business as of 2022, has what is said to be the last opal glass sign in the city.

Collectible
Milk glass has a considerable following of collectors.
Glass makers continue to produce both original pieces and reproductions of popular collectible pieces and patterns.

Notable manufacturers

 Dithridge & Company
 Fenton Glass Company
 Fostoria Glass Company
 Imperial Glass Company
 Kanawha Glass Co.
 L.E. Smith Glass Company
 Mosser Glass
 Thai Soojung Glass Company Limited
 Westmoreland Glass Company

References

External links

 National Milk Glass Collectors Society
 National Westmoreland Glass Collectors Club
 Primary processing of Murano Glass
 Basic Overview on Milk Glass

Glass compositions
Collecting